is a Japanese television drama produced by TV Asahi. The series follows Soichi Haruta, a romantically unsuccessful office worker whose male boss and roommate confess their romantic feelings for him. Noted as one of the first Japanese television dramas in the boys' love (male-male romance) genre, Ossan's Love was initially released as a single-episode television special in 2016, which was adapted into a seven episode television series in 2018. A feature film sequel to the television series, Ossan's Love: Love or Dead, was released in 2019; a second season of the television series titled Ossan's Love: In the Sky aired that same year.

Synopsis
Soichi Haruta, a single 33-year old man, has been unsuccessful in getting a girlfriend. One day, he discovers his boss, Kurosawa, secretly collects images of him and learns that Kurosawa is deeply in love with him. Unsettled by Kurosawa's bold confession and romantic pursuits, Haruta seeks advice from his friends, discovering in the process that his male co-worker is also in love with him. Caught in a love triangle, Haruta navigates through his feelings for his two love interests.

Cast and characters
 

 

Kurosawa is the manager of Haruta's department and is in love with him.
 

Maki is Haruta's 25-year-old roommate who works in the same company under the design department. He is in love with Haruta and becomes protective after discovering Kurosawa is in love with him. In the original 2016 television special, the character was named  and was portrayed by Motoki Ochiai.

Production
Ossan's Love was inspired by producer  experience of being looked after by a female friend while in college, and her desire to explore the subject of romantic relationships between co-workers. Scriptwriter  noted that rather than writing the series as a moe love affair between men, he instead framed it as a romantic drama that merely features men instead of a male-female couple; consequently, Ossan's Love specifically avoids depictions of homophobia or other LGBT-related issues. While Ossan's Love is an original work, Tokuo has noted both shōnen and [[Shōjo manga|shōjo manga]] as among its influences, particularly Marmalade Boy. The series was heavily marketed through social media; "Musashi's Room", an Instagram account featuring in-character posts from Musashi Kurosawa, became widely popular and gained more followers than the series' official account.Ossan's Love was first broadcast as an hour-long television special on December 30, 2016, as the third part of TV Asahi's  series. The program starred Kei Tanaka as Soichi Haruta, Kōtarō Yoshida as Musashi Kurosawa, Motoki Ochiai as Yukiya Hasegawa, and Sae Miyazawa as Asuka Minato. Following positive response from the special, TV Asahi created a 7-episode television series based on the original television special, which was broadcast in 2018. The 2018 series appeared on TV Asahi's  programming block. Tanaka and Yoshida reprised their roles, while Kento Hayashi and Rio Uchida replaced Ochiai and Miyazawa, including characters that were in their original roles.

On January 22, 2019, TV Asahi announced that it would produce a second season of Ossan's Love for release in 2019. The second season, Ossan's Love: In the Sky, is a re-imagining of the series that retains Haruta and Kurosawa's characters, as well as the love triangle plot, but is set in an airport and is not connected to the first season's narrative.

Episodes

Television special (2016)

Season 1 (2018)

Season 2: In the Sky (2019)

Other media

Film
A film sequel to season 1 of the television drama, was released in theaters nationwide on August 23, 2019. In its opening weekend the film sold 239,000 tickets, for a box office gross of ¥343 million. The film grossed a total of ¥2.65 billion, making it the twelfth highest-grossing Japanese film released in 2019.  Several cheer screenings were held throughout the theatrical run.

Manga
A manga adaptation of Ossan's Love illustrated by Umebachi Yamanaka was serialized in the manga magazine Be Love from 2018 to 2020. The series was collected into four  volumes published by Kodansha:

Remake

A Cantonese-language remake of the first season produced in Hong Kong was first announced in February 2021. The remake stars Mirror members Edan Lui and Anson Lo, as well as Kenny Wong. It was later broadcast in Hong Kong on ViuTV beginning June 28, 2021. Episodes 7 to 15 had new content that was not present in the original Japanese version.

Reception
Critical receptionOssan's Love was credited as one of the series that brought interest to the boys' love genre to mainstream audiences outside of anime and manga fans, and was praised in Japan and Hong Kong for its positive portrayal of same-sex couples. (2019) on TV Tokyo, and Cherry Magic! Thirty Years of Virginity Can Make You a Wizard?! (2020) on TV Tokyo, and the live-action film adaptation of The Cornered Mouse Dreams of Cheese (2020). James Marsh from the South China Morning Post gave Ossan's Love: Love or Dead a score of 3 out of 5 stars.

The official guidebook for the first season sold 100,000 physical copies within its first week of sales. During its second week of sales, it sold an additional 56,000 physical copies and became the best-selling official guidebook for a television drama since the 2011 television series Ikemen desu ne.

Awards

|-
| rowspan="17" | 2018
| rowspan="2" | 
| Best Drama
| Ossan's Love| 
| 
|-
| Best Supporting Actor
| Kōtarō Yoshida
| 
| 
|-
| rowspan="5" | Nikkan Sports Drama Grand Prix
| Best Series
| Ossan's Love| 
| 
|-
| Best Actor
| Kei Tanaka
| 
| 
|-
| Best Supporting Actor
| Kento Hayashi
| 
| 
|-
| Best Supporting Actress
| Rio Uchida
| 
| 
|-
| Best Supporting Actress
| Nene Otsuka
| 
| 
|-
| rowspan="7" | 
| Best Series
| Ossan's Love| 
| 
|-
| Best Actor
| Kei Tanaka
| 
| 
|-
| Best Supporting Actor
| Kōtarō Yoshida
| 
| 
|-
| Best Supporting Actor
| Kento Hayashi
| 
| 
|-
| Best Screenplay 
| 
| 
| 
|-
| Best Director
| Toichiro Ruto, Daisuke Yamamoto, Yuki Saito
| 
| 
|-
| Special Award
| "Musashi's Room" (tie-in Instagram account)
| 
| 
|-
| rowspan="3" | Tokyo Drama Awards
| Grand Prix
| Ossan's Love| 
| 
|-
| Best Actor
| Kei Tanaka
| 
| 
|-
| Best Supporting Actor
| Kōtarō Yoshida
| 
| 
|-
| rowspan="7" | 2019
| 
| Grand Prize
| Ossan's Love| 
| 
|-
| rowspan="2" | Elan d'or Awards
| New Face Award
| Kei Tanaka
| 
| 
|-
| Producer Award Encouragement Award
| Yumiko Miwa, Sayuri Kijima, Yuki Jinba, Chizuko Matsuno
| 
|  
|-
| rowspan="4" | Nikkan Sports Drama Grand Prix (Spring Drama)
| Best Series
| Ossan's Love''
| 
| 
|-
| Best Actor
| Kei Tanaka
| 
| 
|-
| Best Supporting Actor
| Kento Hayashi
| 
| 
|-
| Best Supporting Actress
| Rio Uchida
| 
| 
|-

References

External links
 
 Ossan's Love: In the Sky official website

Japanese drama television series
2016 in Japanese television
2018 in Japanese television
2010s Japanese films
2016 Japanese television series debuts
TV Asahi television dramas
Japanese LGBT-related drama television series
2010s LGBT-related drama television series
Japanese boys' love television series